Jürgen Feindt (1930–1978) was a German dancer, choreographer and actor of stage, film and television.

Selected filmography
 Das haut hin (1957)
 Freddy and the Melody of the Night (1960)
 I Will Always Be Yours (1960)
 We Will Never Part (1960)
 Café Oriental (1962)
  (1963)
  (1966)
 Street Acquaintances of St. Pauli (1968)
 Alpine Glow in Dirndlrock (1974)

References

Bibliography 
 Will Lehman & Margit Grieb. Cultural Perspectives on Film, Literature, and Language. Universal-Publishers, 2010.

External links 
 

1930 births
1978 deaths
People from Halberstadt
German male film actors
German male television actors
German male stage actors